NGC 900 is a lenticular galaxy located in the constellation Aries about 430 million light-years from the Milky Way. It was discovered by the German astronomer Albert Marth in 1864.

See also 
 List of NGC objects (1–1000)

References

External links 
 

0900
Lenticular galaxies
Aries (constellation)
009079